All-Star Baseball 2001 is a video game developed by High Voltage Software and KnowWonder and published by Acclaim Entertainment for the Game Boy Color and the Nintendo 64 in 2000.

Reception

The Nintendo 64 version received favorable reviews, while the Game Boy Color version received mixed reviews, according to the review aggregation website GameRankings.

References

External links
 
 

2000 video games
All-Star Baseball video games
Baseball video games
Game Boy Color games
Major League Baseball video games
Nintendo 64 games
North America-exclusive video games
Acclaim Entertainment games
High Voltage Software games
Multiplayer and single-player video games
Video games developed in the United States
Amaze Entertainment games